Georgi Djulgerov is a Bulgarian film director, screenwriter, producer and professor at the National Academy for Theatre and Film Arts.

Career 
Djulgerov was born in Burgas, Bulgaria, on 30 September 1943. After graduating from the Gerasimov Institute of Cinematography in Moscow in 1970, he directed numerous feature films and several documentaries, many of which were shown in the competition or parallel programs of the international film festivals in Berlin, Locarno, Oberhausen, Avellino, Palermo, Rotterdam, Montreal, San Francisco, Batumi, Mons, Mannheim-Heidelberg, and Sarajevo. His movies have also been screened in special programs in Warsaw, Paris, New York, London, Frankfurt-am-Main, Moscow, Kiev, Vienna, Los Angeles, La Rochelle, Riga, Bratislava, Fujisawa, Genoa.

In 1977, his film Advantage won the Silver Bear for Best Director at the 28th Berlin International Film Festival. In 1990, The Camp was selected in the "Quinzaine des réalisateurs" program at the Cannes Film Festival.

In 2005, his film Lady Zee received the Audience Award for Best Film at the Montreal World Film Festival, the Best Film Award and the C.I.C.A.E. Award of the International Confederation of European Art Cinemas at the Sarajevo Film Festival, the FIPRESCI Award at the XIII International Film Festival "Love is Folly" in Varna. In 2006, the film also received the Bulgarian National Film Center award for best film of the year and the award of the Central European Initiative for a film which best represents the reality of contemporary life in Central and Eastern Europe at the 17th edition of the Trieste Film Festival. At the 10th edition of the Sofia International Film Fest, Lady Zee received the FIPRESCI and Kodak awards for best Bulgarian film. It later received two more awards: Best actor award for Ivan Barnev at the Bulgarian Film Makers Union Awards and the Tolerance Award given by the International Jury Of Critics at 13th Palić European Film Festival. Lady Zee was selected among the 49 films competing for the European Film Awards in 2006.

Djulgerov's last film, The Goat (2009), is based on short stories by Yordan Radichkov.

Djulgerov has also staged theatre productions and directed several TV projects. He is a full-time professor in Film and TV Directing at the Krastyo Sarafov National Academy for Theatre and Film Arts in Sofia, Bulgaria, and a voting member of the European Film Academy.

He was a jury member at the 45th Berlin International Film Festival, the 20th Moscow International Film Festival and the 2005 Molodist International Film Festival.

Filmography

References

External links 
 
 Bibliography of Georgi Djulgerov by the Regional Library of Burgas

1943 births
Living people
Bulgarian film directors
Bulgarian film producers
Bulgarian screenwriters
Male screenwriters
Silver Bear for Best Director recipients
Academic staff of the National Academy for Theatre and Film Arts